EAFF E-1 Football Championship, known as the East Asian Football Championship from 2003 to 2010, and the EAFF East Asian Cup for the 2013 and 2015 editions, is a men's international football competition in East Asia for member nations of the East Asian Football Federation (EAFF). Before the EAFF was founded in 2002, the Dynasty Cup was held between the East Asian top four teams, and was regarded as the East Asian Championship. There is a separate competition for men (first held in 2003) and women (first held in 2005).

The winner of the EAFF E-1 Football Championship qualifies for the AFF–EAFF Champions Trophy.

The most recent edition was held in 2022 in Japan.

History
The Dynasty Cup is a defunct international association football competition that is regarded as the predecessor to East Asian Football Championship. It was held four times from 1990 to 1998. The purpose of the competition was to improve the quality of football in the East Asia and the national teams in the area participated in the tournament. After the East Asian Football Federation was formed in 2002, the East Asian Football Championship replaced this tournament.

In the tournament, China, South Korea, and Japan have the right to automatically enter the competition, while other participants have to go through a qualifying round. Other participants that take part are Taiwan, North Korea, Northern Mariana Islands, Guam, Hong Kong, Mongolia, and Macau. Australia, being a non-member of the EAFF, was invited to take part in the 2013 tournament.

In 2005 there was also a combined points competition in 2005, where the results of the men's and women's teams were added together (not including qualifiers). In April 2012, the competition was renamed to the "EAFF East Asian Cup". In December 2015, the new competition name "EAFF East Asian Championship" was approved, but later changed to "EAFF E-1 Football Championship".

Results

Tournament winners

Summary

Final (2003–2022)

Preliminary (2003–2019)

Awards

Winning coaches

Comprehensive team results by tournaments
Numbers refer to the final placing of each team at the respective games.

See also
 EAFF E-1 Football Championship (women)
 AFF Championship
 CAFA Championship
 SAFF Championship
 WAFF Championship
 AFC Asian Cup

References

External links
 EAFF E-1 Football Championship 2022
 EAFF E-1 Football Championship 2019
 EAFF East Asian Cup 2017
 RSSSF Dynasty Cup statistics

 
EAFF competitions
Recurring sporting events established in 2003